"Save Your Scissors" is the first single from City and Colour's debut album Sometimes, released in 2005. The song features Dallas Green's vocals and guitar, without accompaniment.

Music video
The music video shows Dallas' everyday life living in St. Catharines, Ontario, with his playing, eating lunch, stopping by a music store, and going to a practice with Alexisonfire, among other things.

Charts

References 

2005 singles
City and Colour songs
Dine Alone Records singles
2005 songs
Songs written by Dallas Green (musician)